Nabil Al Fadl (1949 – December 22, 2015) was a Kuwaiti politician who was a member of the Kuwaiti National Assembly and a columnist with the Al-Watan newspaper.

His writings
Fadl often harshly criticized fellow members of the National Assembly of Kuwait, especially Ahmad Al-Saadoun, Musallam Al-Barrak and Faisal Al-Muslim Al-Otaibi.

Death
He died on December 22, 2015, during a session of the National Assembly, where he fell unconscious. Efforts to revive him were unsuccessful, and led to the suspension of the meeting and the evacuation of the hall from the public and the media.

References

1949 births
2015 deaths
Kuwaiti Muslims
Members of the National Assembly (Kuwait)
Kuwaiti journalists